This is a list of earthquakes in Samoa.

Earthquakes

See also
List of earthquakes in Tonga
List of earthquakes in Fiji

References 

Earthquakes in Samoa
Samoa
Earthquakes